Riverview is a neighborhood of St. Louis, Missouri.  Riverview comprises the extreme northern section of the city, bounded by the Mississippi River to the east, the city limits to the west, and Chain of Rocks Road to the south, with the northern boundary lying a third of a mile north of I-270. The only major road running through the neighborhood is Riverview Drive.

Demographics

In 2020 Riverview's racial makeup was 69.8% black, 28.1% white, and 1.7% two or more races. 0.4% of the population was of Hispanic or Latino origin.

See also 
 Riverview, St. Louis County, Missouri, a village in adjoining St. Louis County

References 

Neighborhoods in St. Louis